"The Hunt" is the 11th episode of the first season of the HBO original series The Wire. The episode was written by Joy Lusco from a story by David Simon and Ed Burns and was directed by Steve Shill. It originally aired on August 18, 2002.

Plot summary

Rawls and Landsman go to the scene where Greggs and Orlando were shot. Bunk finds her weapon and some footprints and clothes belonging to the gunmen. Rawls finds McNulty in a state of shock. Freamon marshals the detail to get back to working the wiretap so any discussion of the shooting can be used as evidence. Carver informs Greggs' family and her girlfriend, Cheryl, about the shooting. At the hospital, Rawls uncharacteristically tells McNulty that Greggs' shooting is in no way McNulty's responsibility. Cheryl and Carver arrive and Burrell misunderstands Cheryl's relationship with Greggs. Burrell asks Commissioner Warren Frazier if he wants to talk to Cheryl, but Frazier declines and leaves Burrell to go alone, disappointing Carver. Cheryl returns home and breaks down in tears.

The next day, Stringer orders Wee-Bey to murder Little Man for supposedly killing Greggs. In the pit, D'Angelo discusses the shooting with Poot and Bodie. They mistakenly believe that the shooting was unrelated to their organization. Observing from a nearby church roof, Santangelo and Herc watch Bodie receiving a resupply of drugs from the towers. Herc notes the window which the stash is being dropped from. Wallace telephones Poot from his grandmother's house, but is simply homesick and has little to say. Bodie notices that Savino is wanted and Little Man has disappeared. They realize that the shooting must be tied to them. Bodie theorizes that someone has made mistakes and Avon will order his death. At Orlando's, Stringer orders D'Angelo to go with Wee-Bey. Neither Stringer nor Wee-Bey will tell him where they are going, leading D'Angelo to assume he will be killed. However, it turns out D'Angelo has been assigned to drive Wee-Bey to Philadelphia. Wallace phones Poot to ask for money to come home.

As warrants are served on Savino, Freamon and Prez find a page made to Stringer from a payphone near the scene of the shooting. Freamon has crime scene technicians dust the payphone and a nearby discarded drink can for fingerprints. McNulty shows up drunk to work, leading to a confrontation with Daniels. At Homicide, Bunk and Landsman suspect that the shooting was either a stick-up or a setup by the Barksdales. Freamon arrives to confirm that the fingerprints match Little Man. Bubbles, unaware of the shooting, is picked up by two uniformed officers after trying to page Greggs. A confused Bubbles is interrogated by Holley, who begins to beat him and has to be restrained by Landsman. McNulty returns Bubbles to Barksdale territory and gives him money to buy drugs, not realizing that he is trying to stay clean. Bubbles realizes that Wee-Bey and Little Man are the likely shooters and reports to McNulty, who passes the information on to Bunk. Bubbles again tries to tell McNulty that he is clean, but is cut off when McNulty has to leave. He is left holding the money that McNulty gave him.

McNulty threatens to investigate Levy's finances if he does not produce Savino. Pearlman berates him, noting that Levy is a powerful figure in Baltimore law. McNulty makes a remark about State's Attorneys that causes Pearlman to say that he will use anyone. Levy brings Savino in and claims that he had planned to defraud Orlando (by selling him baking soda, rather than actual cocaine), and was not involved in the shooting. Burrell tells Rawls, Foerster, and Daniels to organize citywide drug raids. Daniels tells his men that they will offer the cutting house Herc discovered, but will not tell them about the stash house they have uncovered, in order to protect the wire. However, Major Bobby Reed confronts Daniels about withholding targets, making him realize they have a mole in the detail. McNulty visits Phelan at a campaign fundraiser and fails to convince him to help with Burrell, as the judge has been reinstated on the mayor's ticket. Raids are made against the stash house, Savino's home, and the towers. Carver and Herc are alone when they find a pile of cash and consider keeping some for themselves. Vast quantities of guns, narcotics, and money are seized and Frazier gets his photo opportunity. At the detail, work has all but ceased. Prez monitors light phone traffic (notably, missing Wallace's phone call to Poot requesting to come home, which the officers would have had a keen interest in, since they stashed Wallace with his grandmother in order to protect him), while Greggs remains on life support.

Production

Title reference
The title refers to the knee-jerk police effort to identify the shooter(s) of Detective Greggs and the beginnings of a hunt for a rat in the detail.

Epigraph

The epigraph refers to the commissioner's desire to seize drug dealers' assets in response to the shooting of a police officer, irrespective of how it will affect larger cases. The episode picture shows the results of this desire -  a press conference with plenty of seized drugs to show off in a photo-op. It also serves as a scathing criticism of the progress of the war on drugs.

Music
Masta Ace feat. Strick - Unfriendly Game (during the car ride with D'Angelo and Wee-Bey)

During the scene showing Cheryl's grief over Greggs' grave injury, Nina Simone's "Sugar in My Bowl" is playing.

Credits

Guest stars

References

External links
"The Hunt" at HBO.com

The Wire (season 1) episodes
2002 American television episodes